Tintahalak Sportegyesület Szabadkikötő is a professional football club based in Sashalom, Budapest, Hungary, that competes in the Nemzeti Bajnokság III, the third tier of Hungarian football.

History
THSE Sashalom is going to compete in the 2017–18 Nemzeti Bajnokság III.

On 12 August 2017, Sashalom beat Csepel FC 2–1 at the Béke téri Stadion, Csepel, Budapest on the first matchday of the 2017-18 Nemzeti Bajnokság III season.

Honours

Domestic
Blasz I:
Winner (1): 2016–17

Managers
 Marcell Strebek

External links
 Profile on Magyar Futball

References

Football clubs in Hungary
Association football clubs established in 2000
2000 establishments in Hungary